William Hugh Fullerton  (born 11 February 1939) is a British retired diplomat

Fullerton studied Oriental Languages at Queens' College, Cambridge. He worked for Shell International Petroleum in Uganda from 1963 to 1965, leaving to join the Foreign Office. He attended a course at MECAS (1965-1966) and then served as Information Officer in Jedda (1966-1967).

After spells in Jamaica and Turkey Fullerton was Consul-General in Islamabad (1981-1983); Ambassador to Somalia (1983-1987); Governor of the Falkland Islands (1988-1992); and finally British Ambassador to Kuwait (1992-1996).

Honours
  Companion of the Order of St Michael and St George (CMG) - 1989

References

1939 births
Living people
Members of HM Diplomatic Service
Alumni of Queens' College, Cambridge
Ambassadors of the United Kingdom to Kuwait
Ambassadors of the United Kingdom to Somalia
Governors of the Falkland Islands
20th-century British diplomats